The Intrépide was a First Rank three-decker ship of the line of the French Royal Navy. She was intended to be armed with 68 guns as a Second Rank ship including a partially armed upper deck, but was modified during construction and completed as a First Rank with 82 guns, comprising twenty-eight 36-pounder guns on the lower deck, twenty-six 18-pounder guns on the middle deck, and twenty-four 8-pounder guns on the upper deck (two more were added from 1706), with four 4-pounder guns on the quarterdeck.

Designed and constructed by Honoré Malet, she was begun at Rochefort Dockyard in April 1689 and launched in March of the following year. She was completed in May 1690 and took part in the Battle of Beachy Head on 10 July 1690. She later took part in the Battle of Lagos on 28 June 1693 and in the Battle of Velez Malaga on 24 August 1704. In July 1707 she was one of the ships scuttled at Toulon on Louis XIV's orders during the siege of that port, but was subsequently refloated and refitted. She was condemned in June 1717 at Toulon and used as a hulk, before being taken to pieces in 1724.

References

Nomenclature des Vaisseaux du Roi-Soleil de 1661 a 1715. Alain Demerliac (Editions Omega, Nice – various dates).
The Sun King's Vessels (2015) - Jean-Claude Lemineur; English translation by François Fougerat. Editions ANCRE.  
Winfield, Rif and Roberts, Stephen (2017) French Warships in the Age of Sail 1626-1786: Design, Construction, Careers and Fates. Seaforth Publishing. . 

Ships of the line of the French Navy
1690s ships
Ships built in France